The Upper Main Street Historic District is a predominantly residential historic district in northeastern Hatfield, Massachusetts.  Unlike Hatfield Center, which dated to colonial days and lies south of the district, this part of Hatfield developed roughly between 1860 and 1939 as a village centered on the nearby ferry landing on the Connecticut River.  The district includes properties in a roughly triangular area bounded by Main Street, King Street, and North Street, and features a large number of Colonial Revival, Queen Anne, and bungalow-style houses.  The district was listed on the National Register of Historic Places in 1994.

The town center of Hatfield was laid out in 1661, with narrow house lots facing the main road, and large agricultural areas surrounding the village.  The southern portion of this district includes a portion of the original town plan, which is still evident in the placement of houses and surrounding land use.  In addition to the residential buildings lining its roads, the district also includes agricultural buildings related to the area's historic patterns of agriculture.  Prominent among these are several tobacco barns, reflecting the importance of that crop in the town's 19th century economic prosperity.  There are also several surviving livestock and horse barns, of which one of the former dates to about 1800.  The oldest house in the district, the Jeremiah Bardwell House at 108 Main Street, is of similar vintage, dating to about 1790.

See also
Bradstreet Historic District
North Hatfield Historic District
West Hatfield Historic District
National Register of Historic Places listings in Hampshire County, Massachusetts

References

Hatfield, Massachusetts
Historic districts in Hampshire County, Massachusetts
National Register of Historic Places in Hampshire County, Massachusetts
Historic districts on the National Register of Historic Places in Massachusetts